Basie's Beat is a 1967 album by Count Basie and his orchestra.

The trombonist Richard Boone sings on two of the tracks, "Boone's Blues" and "I Got Rhythm".

Track listing
 "It's Only a Paper Moon" (Harold Arlen, E.Y. "Yip" Harburg, Billy Rose) - 2:43  
 "Squeeze Me" (Fats Waller, Clarence Williams) - 4:56
 "St. Louis Blues" (W. C. Handy) - 5:26 
 "I Got Rhythm" (George Gershwin, Ira Gershwin) - 2:37 
 "Frankie and Johnny" (Traditional) - 3:43
 "Boone's Blues" (Richard Boone) - 2:50 
 "St. Thomas" (Sonny Rollins) - 3:06 
 "Hey Jim" - 4:10
 "Happy House" - 4:23
 "Makin' Whoopee" (Walter Donaldson, Gus Kahn) - 5:09

Personnel
The Count Basie Orchestra
Count Basie - piano, arranger
Richard Boone - vocals, trombone
Bobby Plater, Marshall Royal - alto saxophone
Charlie Fowlkes - baritone saxophone
Norman Keenan - double bass
Ed Shaughnessy, Rufus Jones - drums
Freddie Green - guitar
Billy Mitchell, Eddie "Lockjaw" Davis, Eric Dixon, Marshall Brown - tenor saxophone
Al Grey, Grover Mitchell, Harlan Floyd, Henderson Chambers - trombone
Bill Hughes - bass trombone
Al Aarons, Gene Goe, Harry "Sweets" Edison, Phil Guilbeau, Sonny Cohn, Wallace Davenport - trumpet

Production
Acy R. Lehman - cover design
Phil Ramone, Bob Arnold - engineer
Val Valentin - director of engineering
Stanley Dance - liner notes
Chuck Stewart - photography
Teddy Reig - producer

References

1967 albums
Count Basie Orchestra albums
Verve Records albums
Albums produced by Teddy Reig